Most early Asian settlers to the United States went to Hawaii. Most of these early immigrants moved to the islands as laborers to work on the pineapple, coconut, and sugarcane plantations. These early migrants have tended to stay, although a handful returned to their home countries. There has also been recent immigration to Hawaii from more ethnic Asian groups, including the Thai, Indonesian, and the Vietnamese.

Filipinos

Filipinos, like most other Southeast Asian immigrants to Hawaii, worked on the sugar plantations. In 2010, Filipinos surpassed Japanese as the largest ethnic group. At the time of the 2000 census, they were the third largest ethnic group in the islands.

85% of Filipinos in Hawaii trace their ancestry to the Ilocos Region of northern Luzon.

Japanese

Until 2010, people of Japanese ancestry made up the plurality of Hawaii's population. After the breakout of World War II, 
more than 110,000 Japanese Americans in the mainland U.S., who mostly lived on the West Coast, were forced into internment camps. However, in Hawai'i, where 150,000-plus Japanese Americans composed over one-third of the population, only 1,200 to 1,800 were also interned.

Korean

Koreans mainly came to the islands to work on the pineapple and sugar plantations, but a few, including the family of Mary Paik Lee, came to the mainland (usually California) after experiencing extreme discrimination.

Chinese

The Chinese came to the Hawaiian islands in 1778; the same year as English explorer James Cook. Few also came to the islands among the crew of James Cook. Today, some Chinese born on the islands can claim to be seventh generation.

75% of Hawaii’s Chinese community are Cantonese with ancestry from Zhongshan, Guangdong.

Indians

People of Indian origin did not come to Hawaii in sizable numbers, and those who did did not stay for long. Many early Indian immigrants stopped in Hawaii only to make enough money to sail on to the mainland anywhere from the mid to late 1800s to the 1900s.

A notable Indian in Hawaii was Dalip Singh Saund, who on September 13, 1910, arrived in Honolulu from his home village in Punjab, India at the age of 14. He labored in the sugarcane fields for about two months to earn enough money to continue on to California. On November 18, 1910, he arrived on Angel Island. At one point, Saund was the nation's largest celery grower.

Okinawans 

When Japan annexed Okinawa (formerly known as the Ryukyu Kingdom), the Okinawan economy started to decline. As a result, there was a growing demand for the Japanese government to allow Okinawans to migrate elsewhere. The first of these Okinawans came to Hawaii in 1899 under the supervision of Kyuzo Toyama, who is known as the "father of Okinawan emigration".

Okinawans in Hawaii tend to view themselves as a distinct group from the Japanese in Hawaii. The Center for Okinawan Studies at the University of Hawaiʻi (Mānoa) estimates that the Okinawan community numbers anywhere between 45,000-50,000 people, or 3% of Hawaii’s population.

See also

Indian American - the same ethnic group, but this also includes other areas of the United States.
Filipino American - the same ethnic group, but this also includes other areas of the United States.
Japanese American - the same ethnic group, but this also includes other areas of the United States.
Korean American - the same ethnic group, but this also includes other areas of the United States.
Chinese American - the same ethnic group, but this also includes other areas of the United States.
Ryukyuan American (Okinawan American) - the same ethnic group, but this also includes other areas of the United States.
Asian American - the immigration of all the people of the continent of Asia to the United States.
Asian Canadian - the immigration of all the people of the continent of Asia to Canada.
Asian Pacific American - a category that applies both to Pacific Islander American, and Asian Americans.
Asian Latin American - the immigration of all the people of the continent of Asia to Central America, South America, and Mexico.
Indians in Fiji - the importation of Indians to the Fiji Islands to labor on its sugar plantations.
Filipino immigration to Mexico - the immigration of Filipinos to the country of Mexico.
Chinese immigration to Puerto Rico - the immigration of the Chinese to the present day U.S. territory of Puerto Rico.

Bibliography

 Takaki, Ronald T and Rebecca Stefoff. Raising Cane: The World of Plantation Hawaii (Asian American Experience) (1993)
 Tamura, Eileen H. "Using the Past to Inform the Future: An Historiography of Hawaii's Asian and Pacific Islander Americans", Amerasia Journal, (2000), 26#1, pp 55–85

References

 
Immigration to the United States
Ethnic groups in Hawaii